Bole is a shade of reddish brown. 
The color term derives from Latin  (or dirt) and refers to a kind of soft fine clay whose reddish-brown varieties are used as pigments, and as a coating in panel paintings and frames underneath the paint or gold leaf.  Under gold leaf, it "warms" the colour, which can have a greenish shade otherwise.  However, bole in art is a good deal more red and less brown than the modern shade; it is often called Armenian bole. Although bole also means the trunk of a tree, these words are simply homographs that do not share an etymological origin.

Overview
Another name for the color bole is terra rosa.  The color name terra rosa has been used as a synonym for bole since 1753. The color terra rosa is classified a warm red color.  In art, it's classified as being similar to Venetian red, but more pink or salmon. In French, it corresponds to the color châtaigne.
	 
Bole is one of the oldest color names in English. The first recorded use of bole as a color name in English was in the year 1386.

See also 
 List of colors

References

External links
 ISCC-NBS Dictionary of Color Names (1955)--Color dictionary used by stamp collectors to identify the colors of stamps — See sample of the color Bole (color sample #43) displayed on indicated page.

Bole